General McRae may refer to:

Alexander Duncan McRae (1874–1946), Canadian Army major general
Dandridge McRae (1829–1899), Confederate States Army brigadier general
James McRae (United States Army officer) (1862–1940), U.S. Army major general
William MacRae (1834–1882), Confederate States Army brigadier general